Charles Moss may refer to:

 Charles Moss (bishop of Bath and Wells) (1711–1802), Anglican clergyman
 Charles Moss (bishop of Oxford) (1763–1811), Church of England bishop
 Charles Moss (cyclist) (1882–1963), English road racing cyclist
 Charles Moss (judge) (1840–1912), Canadian lawyer and judge
 Charles Edward Moss (died 1930), English-born South African botanist